Sulphuric Acid is a Belgian novel by Amélie Nothomb. It was first published in 2005. It details the thoughts and pursuits of the people involved in a reality show recreating a concentration camp.

The book provoked strong reactions, both for and against. Nothomb was subsequently invited to explain herself on a TV show hosted by her friend Frédéric Beigbeder.

Plot 
For a TV reality show called Concentration, prisoner-participants are chosen at random from the population and abducted in raids. The living conditions in the camp are deplorable: the prisoners are ill-nourished, insulted, and beaten by the guards (called "Kapos"). Each day, two prisoners are chosen and killed on-camera. Zdeno, one of the guards, falls in love with Pannonique, the heroine of the book and a prisoner known in the camp by her identity number CKZ 114. Zdeno wants to know Pannonique's real name and she's ready to do anything to find out, going as far as killing prisoners who are close to Pannonique. The media expresses shock, thereby inciting more and more people to watch the series. Concentration reaches a frenzy of scandal when the producers give the public the right to decide which prisoners will be killed in public. The TV audience votes en masse, and more and more people take up watching.

See also 
 Stanford prison experiment

References 

2005 Belgian novels
French-language novels
Novels by Amélie Nothomb
Éditions Albin Michel books